Stadionul Mogoșoaia is a football stadium in Romania which is part of the National Football Centre. Located in Mogoșoaia, it holds 2,000 people.

The training ground of the Romania national football team, it held four games at the 2011 UEFA European Under-19 Football Championship, three group matches and a semifinal.

References

External links 
 CNAFM – Centrul Național de Fotbal Mogoşoaia
 Mogoşoaia Stadium on Soccerway.com

Football venues in Romania